Buenaventura is a coastal seaport city located in the Pacific Region of the department of Valle del Cauca, Colombia (South America). Buenaventura (Spanish for "good fortune") is the main port of Colombia in the Pacific Ocean.

Buenaventura is a city with a population of 235,064 as of the 2018 census. Most city development lies on Cascajal Island. Most of the city's land is rural with scattered small villages. It is served by the Gerardo Tobar López Airport.

The city is part of the UNESCO Creative Cities Network after it was named "City of Gastronomy" in 2017.

History
The city was founded on July 14, 1540, by Juan de Ladrilleros through orders from Pascual de Andagoya.  At that time it was inhabited by the Buscajas. The city was destroyed by Native Americans before 1600; it was later rebuilt.  Buenaventura thrived after the opening of the Panama Canal in 1914; and in the 1950s became a regular stopover for the 'international jet set'. Today, the city is crucial for sending raw materials to nearby areas; this has brought prosperity and allowed recent new development to occur.

Demographics

Ethnic Composition
According to the 2018 DANE census, its demographic composition is as follows:

Afro-Colombian: 220,318 (85.25%)

Whites and Mestizos: 29,825 (11.54%)

No response: 4,289 (1.66%)

Indigenous: 3,919 (1.52%)

Raizal: 48 (0.02%)

Palenquero: 33 (0.01%)

Romani: 13 (0.01%)

Transport

Port
The city is one of the major ports on the continent, accounting for nearly 60% of all Colombian sea imports and exports. However, due to its strategic position, the city's economy has been hampered by gang-related activity fighting over control of the port, making it among the most impoverished cities in Colombia.

Rivers
The city is surrounded by rivers, including: the Dagua; the Anchicayá; the Calima; the Raposo; the Mayorquín; the Cajambre; the Yurumanguí; and part of the right arm of the Naya River and part of the left arm of the River San Juan at its mouth. In addition, it has many streams and smaller rivers, such as Agua Clara, San Marcos, Sabaletas, San Cipriano and Escalerete, which supplies the municipal capital through an aqueduct.

Road
Well paved and maintained roads, that are designed to be unaffected by landslides, leave the city via Loboguerrero, where it divides to go to Cali, or Buga and then onwards to the cities of Armenia, Medellín and Bogotá. This route is known as "La Vía al Mar", as it connects the parts of the country together.

Airport
Gerardo Tobar López Airport connects Buenaventura with direct flights of 1 hour 20 minutes to Bogotá via Satena, as well as to other cities.

Crime

Buenaventura has had a notorious history plagued by the Colombian armed conflict, drug trafficking, violence, and the presence of guerrilla and paramilitary groups.

Colombian authorities have seized almost US$28 million in cash from drug kingpins. The money found was in several shipping containers sent from Manzanillo, Colima (Mexico) and Houston (United States), that belonged to brothers Luis Enrique and Javier Antonio Calle Serna, also known as the ‘Combas’.

Between 2008 and 2010, the number of reported homicides in the city doubled. In 2010, the murder rate of Buenaventura was 175.2 homicides per 100,000, a rate 5 times the national average.  To counter the violence, the Colombian government has set up a marine special forces unit in the worst area of the city. In 2011, it seemed that counter-violence efforts had improved crime metrics, even while aspects of the Colombian drug war in that city worsened. According to community activist Victor Hugo Vidal, "If you ask the authorities, they will tell you [the city] is better -- that the homicide rates are way down. But for us [living here], during the last 10 years, there has been no change."

Education

Universities
The city hosts higher education universities, both private and public:

Public
Universidad del Valle is the leading academic institution in south-western Colombia, with the third-highest student population in the country. Its main campus is in the city of Cali, but apart from the capital of Valle del Cauca, there are campuses in Barrio San Fernando, where the Faculty of Health and the Faculty of Administration are based, and they have regional headquarters in: Buga, Cartago, Caicedonia, Northern Cauca, Buenaventura, Palmira, Tulua, Yumbo and Zarzal. In has a total of 30,000 students (2007) of which almost 25,000 are undergraduates and 5,000 postgraduates. The headquarters of the Universidad del Valle in the city of Buenaventura, are on the Avenida Simon Bolivar km 9 Contiguo ITI College, GVC.
Universidad del Pacífico - is a University Public Institution of Higher Education. It has five academic programs; Systems Engineering, Architecture, Sociology, Humid Tropics Agriculture, Aquaculture Technology, and Computer Technology. The administrative office is located at Avenida Simon Bolivar # 54A-10 in Buenaventura. It also has offices in Guapi and Tumaco.
Universidad del Quindío

Private
Universidad Antonio Nariño is one of the largest private universities in the country, with campuses in nearly all major cities in Colombia, including Buenaventura

Geography

Climate
Buenaventura, like all of the Colombia Pacific Coast, has an extremely consistent, wet, cloudy, humid and hot tropical rainforest climate (Köppen Af).

Tourism

The most notable tourist venue is the Cascajal Island located in the western part of the city. It is inhabited, and is surrounded by marshes and in it are important tourist and commercial sites including Néstor Urbano Tenorio park, the field of handicrafts sea of the same, the cathedral San Buenaventura Hotel Station, the ramp or site boats to go to nearby islands and the pier.

Piangüita, a coastal town near Buenaventura, has the Ecoparque Theme Green Iguanas, created by Rigoberto Gomez. The Ecopark comprises four hectares, and is part of the homelands of the black community of Bazán. It also has beaches which attract tourists.

Bahía Málaga is a deepwater port designed to provide support to large ships that cannot enter the port of Buenaventura.

Places of interest
Cathedral of Buenaventura
National Palace
San Cipriano and Escalarete rivers Nature Reserve.
Beaches of La Bocana, Piangüita, Juanchaco, Ladrilleros and La Barra
Hotel Maguipi 
Botanical Garden Bushes, within the area of Bahía Málaga Uramba National Natural Park

Other places of interest
Néstor Urbano Tenorio Park
Tourist floating dock.
Mural "Buenaventura 450 years in space"
Spa on the outskirts of the city
Hotel Station

Notable natives and residents
Petronio Álvarez Quintero, singer-songwriter Currulao
Juan Carlos Candelo, former NABF Light Middleweight champion
Raul Cuero, professor of microbiology at Prairie View A&M University and Inventor
Margarita Diez-Colunje y Pombo (1838-1919), historian, translator, genealogist
Marbelle, pop singer
Edison Miranda, a 2000 Colombia Olympian, former WBO Latino, NABA, and IBF Latino Middleweight champion
 Fernando Montaño, soloist with the Royal Ballet in London
Freddy Rincón, retired Colombian football midfielder
Gerardo Valencia Cano, Apostolic vicariate de Buenaventura
Adolfo Valencia, retired Colombian football striker

Sport
The city has had two professional football teams; each club played Categoría Primera B and had only a short existence. Pacífico F.C. only existed for the 2010–2011 season, whereas Atlético Buenaventura played between 1991 and 1995.

References

External links

Municipalities of Valle del Cauca Department
Populated places established in 1545
Port cities in Colombia
Ports and harbours of Colombia
1545 establishments in the Spanish Empire